Puya leptostachya is a species in the genus Puya. This species is endemic to Bolivia.

References

leptostachya
Flora of Bolivia